Viktor Lazlo (real name: Sonia Dronnier, born 7 October 1960) is a French-Belgian singer. 

Born in France, she studied in Belgium, where she is primarily known. Her biggest hit was  "Breathless" in 1987. That year she also hosted the Eurovision Song Contest 1987 held in Brussels.

Dronnier took her stage name from Paul Henreid's character Victor Laszlo in the 1942 film Casablanca. She sings in French, English, Spanish and German.

In October 2016, Lazlo announced the release of her new single "Promised Land". In February 2017, she released her new single "Lola & Jim" followed by new studio album Woman in October 2017.

Biography 

Lazlo was born in France to parents who are originally from Martinique and Grenada. She grew up in Belgium, studied art history and also worked as a model.

Discography

Albums
Most of her albums were released in an English/international and a French version. The discography lists both albums (naming the international version first). Also, numerous compilation albums have been released. The discography only lists those albums released by record companies to which she was signed at that point.

In 1987, a vocal clip of Lazlo announcing ‘Germany, ten points!’ at the Eurovision Song Contest was sampled in ‘Okay!’ by Okay!, a dance record that reached #1 in Austria and #2 in Germany.

 1985 She / Canoë Rose
 1987 Viktor Lazlo
 1989 Hot & Soul / Club Desert
 1990 Sweet, Soft N' Lazy (The Exclusive Collection) (official compilation album, incl. several new songs)
 1991 My Delicious Poisons / Mes poisons délicieux
 1993  Sweet, Soft & Lazy: The Very Best Of  (the first official "best of"-album)
 1996 Back to Front / Verso
 2002 Loin de Paname (album of French chansons)
 2002 Amour(s)
 2004 Saga
 2007 Begin The Biguine
 2012 My Name is Billie Holiday
 2017 Woman

Singles 
Single releases differed from country to country. The brackets indicate where the single was released. Int = international.

 1984 "Backdoor Man" (int)
 1985 "Canoë Rose" (France)
 1985 "Last Call for an Angel" (Belgium)
 1985 "Slow Motion" (int)
 1986 "Pleurer des rivières" (France)
 1986 "Sweet Soft & Lazy" (int)
 1987 "Breathless" (int)
 1987 "Take Me" (Germany)
 1988 "You Are My Man" (int)
 1988 "Amour Puissance Six" (int)
 1989 "City Never Sleeps" (int)
 1989 "In The Midnight Sky" (Germany)
 1990 "Das Erste Mal Tat's Noch Weh" (duet with Stefan Waggershausen) (Germany)
 1990 "Jesse" (duet with Stefan Waggershausen) (Germany)
 1990 "Ansiedad" (int)
 1991 "Baiser sacré" (duet with Xavier Deluc) (France)
 1991 "Teach Me To Dance" (int)
 1991 "Love Insane" (int)
 1991 "Balade De Lisa" (France)
 1993 "The Dream Is in Our Hands" (int)
 1993 "Vattene amore" (duet with Amedeo Minghi) (Italy)
 1994 "Engel Wie Du" (duet with Juliane Werding / Maggie Reilly) (Germany)
 1996 "My Love" (int)
 1996 "Turn It All Around" (int)
 1998 "Besame Mucho" (duet with Raul Paz) (int)
 1999 "Le message est pour toi" (duet with Biagio Antonacci) (int)
 2002 "The Sound Of Expectation" (promo single from "Amour(s)")
 2004 "Love To Love You Baby" (int)
 2004 "Total Disguise" (duet with Serhat) (English)
 2007 "J'attends" (promo single from "Begin The Biguine")
 2016 "Promised Land" 
 2017 "Lola & Jim"
 2017 "Debout"

Charts

Albums

Singles

See also
 List of Eurovision Song Contest presenters
 The film Casablanca – Victor Laszlo is an escaped concentration camp prisoner, who is trying to procure a visa so he can travel to America with his wife.

References

External links

Official MySpace page (with sound files from her album Begin The Biguine);
 Official fan blog page
 
 Viktor Lazlo – The Belgian Pop & Rock Archives

 

1960 births
Living people
Musicians from Lorient
French women singers
Alumni of the European Schools
Belgian women singers
French emigrants to Belgium
English-language singers from Belgium
English-language singers from France
French people of Martiniquais descent
French people of Grenadian descent
French-language singers of Belgium
German-language singers
Spanish-language singers of France
Spanish-language singers of Belgium
Belgian people of Martiniquais descent
Belgian people of Grenadian descent
Polydor Records artists